Paiute (also Piute) refers to three non-contiguous groups of indigenous peoples of the Great Basin. Although their languages are related within the Numic group of Uto-Aztecan languages, these three languages do not form a single subgroup.  The term "Paiute" does not refer to a single, unique, unified group of Great Basin tribes, but is a historical label comprising:
 Northern Paiute people of northeastern California, northwestern Nevada, eastern Oregon, and southern Idaho
 Southern Paiute people of northern Arizona, southern Nevada, and southwestern Utah
 Mono people of east central California, divided into Owens Valley Paiute (Eastern Mono) and Western Mono (Monache)